Palakollu is a city and the administrative headquarters of Palakollu Mandal in Narasapuram revenue division in West Godavari district of the Indian state of Andhra Pradesh. Palakollu is situated in Coastal Andhra region of the state. It occupies .  census, it has a population of about 61,284 and a Metro population of about 81,199. Palakollu Municipality merged five Grama panchayats of Seven village's (Kontheru, Adavipalem, Palakollu Rural, Bhaggeswaram, Poolapalli, Varidhanam And Ullamparru) on dated 7 January 2020. the Seven Village's population of 42,932 (as 2011 Census) It around occupies  and after merged palakollu municipality It around occupies  with 35 election wards it is total population of 1,04,216 (as 2011 Census) and making it the third most populous urban area in West Godavari District in Andhra Pradesh. It is a part of Eluru Urban Development Authority.

In 2018, as per the Swachh Bharat mission of the Ministry of Urban Development, Under Swachh Survekshan - 2018 Palakollu Municipality was ranked 43rd in the South Zone out of 1113 With Zonal Avg Marks 1438.96 And State Rank 20th Out of 79 With State Avg Marks 1916.2 Palakollu ULB Census Coad 802966.

Palakollu was selected for the year 2015-16 Housing for All Under Pradhan Mantri Awas Yojana for houseless poor in the urban areas. 

It is bounded by Krishna district and Vijayawada on the west, Amalapuram and Bay of Bengal on the east, Narasapuram and Bay of Bengal on the south, and  Rajahmundry and East Godavari district on the north.

Palakollu is home to Ksheerarama, one of the five great Pancharama Kshetras.

Etymology 

Palakollu was also known as "Upamanyapuram" or "Ksheerapuri" or "Palakolanu" or "palacole", named after the lord Ksheera Ramalingeswara Swamy. Gradually it changed into "Upamanyapuram" or "Ksheerapuri" or "Palakolanu"and now to Palakollu.
Dugdhopavanapuram and Upamanyapuram are palakollu names for palakollu. The name of Upamanyapuram and the palakollu is derived from the place where the great devotee Upamanyudu attained mammal. The name Palakollu In the affairs of the became the palakollu of the masses. There is also in the dealing of the ksheera ramam as a Sanskritization of the name of palakollu.

History
Palakol or Palakollu was originally known as Kshiraramam, Kshirapuram, Palakolanu or Upamanyapuram.

In 1613, the Dutch built their first Indian factory at Palakollu, which was temporarily abandoned in 1730. Part of Dutch Coromandel, it was a trading post for textiles, lamp oil, wood, roof tiles, and bricks.

Under the 1783 Treaty of Paris, the town was ceded to the British, but the Dutch continued to rent it from them until 1804. In 1818 it was formerly restored to the Dutch only to be ceded again to the British in 1824.

Palakollu is also known as Trilinga Desam, the region bounded by three lingas (Srisailam, Draksharamam and Kaleswaram)

The most famous Ksheerarama is one of the five Pancharama Kshetras, and is located in Palakollu. Lord Shiva is known locally as Ksheera Ramalingeswara Swamy. The Sivalinga was established by Lord Vishnu.

The famous Sri Lakshmi Ganapathi Navagraha Subrahmanya Aalayam, temple located at Brodipeta 2nd Lane in Palakollu. The presiding deity is Lord Ganapathi in the divine form of Lakshmi Ganapathi, along with the Navagrahalu and Subrahmanya Swamy deities.

Under the Qutb Shahi reign

Textile Industry Center
During the reign of Golkonda Qutub Shahi in the 16th and 17th centuries, the textile industry was flourishing in the Palakollu region. Made of cotton, calico, lingerie and blankets. Textiles made of colored dye were also made in palakollu. All of these garments reached the port of Machilipatnam and from there shipped to various parts of the country by ship. In 1770, agriculture and business were disrupted by a major drought that hit the Krishna and Godavari deltas. The drought has had an adverse effect on the textile industry, which is home to the palakollu industry. The Dutch industry reports that the textile industry in the palakollu in region had slowed down in the late 18th century. The rise of textile imports from England in the 19th century, along with other Coromandel coastal textile centers, has also severely damaged Palakollu textile. In the case of the markets where textile products are sold, England's milling of local garments has begun in the region. This has caused the palakollu industry to become the center of the textile industry.

Fabric industry
Under the rule of the Qutb Shahi, the iron-making industry in Palakollu was elastic. The Narasapuram Shipbuilding industry is nearby . In India, iron ships were generally made of wood in other areas. Due to the lack of iron in the Godavari Delta region, Narasapur was only used for making nails and other iron tools. These conditions have given rise to the iron nail industry in palakollu.

Geography 
It is in the southern part of Andhra Pradesh in southeastern India. The town occupies an area of  under the administration of Palakollu Municipality (PMC). There is one major Rajamahendravaram - Narsapuram Canal that supplies water to the town: New Water Lake and old water lake apart from the Godavari River. Small canals are used only for agricultural and industrial purposes. Palakollu is a flat country with a slight eastern slope along the canals of the town flow. The canals in Palakollu generally flow from west to east.

It is bounded by Penugonda Village on the north, Narasapuram on the south. The Godavari River separates East Godavari district on east and Bhimavaram on the west.

There is paddy and sugarcane cultivation in the area.

Climate 
Palakollu has a tropical climate. When compared with winter, the summers have much more rainfall. The climate here is classified as Aw by the Köppen-Geiger system. In Palakollu, the average annual temperature is 27.9 °C. In a year, the average rainfall is 1208 mm. The driest month is January, with 1 mm of rainfall. In October, the precipitation reaches its peak, with an average of 286 mm. The warmest month of the year is May, with an average temperature of 32.4 °C. At 23.4 °C on average, January is the coldest month of the year. The difference in precipitation between the driest month and the wettest month is 285 mm. The variation in annual temperature is around 9.0 °C. The weather is hot and humid, with a tropical climate and, thereby, no distinct seasons. The coolest months are December and January There is heavy monsoon rain at the end of summer, with depressions in the Bay of Bengal.

Culture 

The town is known in the state for its cultural history whose residents are more often referred as 'Palakollu'. There are many religions, languages, traditions and festivals. Shiva Puja and a special Maha Shivaratri Karthika Masam in Karthikai Deepam are important events of the Hindu festival of Makar Sankranti in the town, mainly due to the existence of the self manifested Ksheerarama Temple. Palakollu town Mosque is a Muslim shrine housing the holy relic of the Prophet Mohammed. The St. John Luther Church, Sambhunipeta Lutheran Church, Church of Christ, St. Andrews Lutheran Church, is an important shrine for Christians and illuminates on Christmas Eve.

The clothing of the locals include traditional men wearing dhoti and women wearing saree and salwar kameez. Western clothing is also predominant.

Film industry people 

The town is notable for many artists like Chiranjeevi, Allu Ramalingiah, Allu Aravind, Kodi Ramakrishna, Dasari Narayana Rao, Chalam, Mandolin Srinivas, RaviRaja Pinisetty, Chintapalli Ramana, Nookala Chinna Satyanarayana, Ghazal Srinivas (recipient of Guinness World Record for most languages sung), Beri Thimappa (founder of Madras), Veera Pothana (Nandi awardee, cine and drama writer), R. NaniKrishna (film director and producer), Chanti Addala (art director and producer), Relangi Narasimha Rao (director), Bunny vasu (producer), Maruthi (director), Ananth Sriram (lyricist).

Allu Rama Lingaiah, commonly known as Allu, was an Indian Telugu language comedic actor from Palakollu, who appeared in over one thousand Tollywood films.

Anantha Sriram Chegondi is an Indian lyricist, mainly writing lyrics for songs in Telugu language films. He is one of the most sought after lyricists in the Telugu film Industry.

Dasari Narayana Rao  is an Indian film actor, director and producer in Telugu cinema. He has directed about 140 films, produced three films, and worked as a dialogue writer and as a lyricist. Actor Chiranjeevi contested the 2009 Lok sabha elections from his hometown and lost.

Administration

Municipality

The Palakollu Municipal Council (PMC) is the municipal governing body of the town. It was constituted as a municipality on 1 April 1919. Each ward is represented by a councilor, elected by popular vote. The Council Members democratically elected headed by a municipal chairman, who is the titular head of PMC; executive powers rest with the municipal commissioner, appointed by the state government. The PMC carries out the town's infrastructural work such as building and maintenance of roads and drains, town planning including construction regulation, maintenance of municipal markets and parks, solid waste management, the issuing of birth and death certificates, the issuing of trade licenses, collection of property tax, and community welfare services such as mother and child healthcare, and pre-school and non-formal education.

The municipality was constituted in 1919 and upgraded as a third grade municipality in 1952. The Palakollu Municipality was upgraded to first grade in August 1965. Its constituents include the municipality of Palakollu, and the outgrowths of Poolapalli, Ullamparru, and Palakollu (rural). Now Palakollu municipality 1 January 2019: Eluru Urban Development Authority (EUDA) created. Palakollu became a part of EUDA along with places in West Godavari District.

Palakollu (Assembly constituency) is a legislative assembly constituency in Andhra Pradesh. Sri Chodisetty Surya Rao was its longest serving municipal chairman, from 1956 to 1986. Many colleges ASNM, Dasari Women's degree college, Coco Junior govt college, 34 acres of drinking water tanks developed with 20 year vision, government hospital, and lorry stand are all developed under his regime. As gratitude people of Palakol erected a bronze statue in center of the town.

E-governance services 

For providing facilities to the people the Government of Andhra Pradesh started MeeSeva (at your service) centres all around the town and the state. The main purpose of this facility was to bring public services closer to home. MeeSeva provides online signed digital certificates like income certificates, residence certificates, land records and other registration records. These records are further stored in an online database.

Healthcare

Palakollu is becoming one of the major healthcare centers in West Godavari District. Government General Hospital is one of the major government hospitals in the West Godavari District, also serving patients from the cities and neighbouring mandals of Poduru, Yelamanchili and Penugonda. The town has about 50 hospitals including surgeons, orthopedics, gynecologists, dental specialists, ENTs, eye specialists, RMPs and PMPs.

Politics

Palakollu Assembly constituency is one of the constituencies for Andhra Pradesh Legislative Assembly. Nimmala Rama Naidu is the present MLA of the constituency from Telugu Desam Party. The constituency falls under Narasapuram (Lok Sabha constituency) which was won by Kanumuru Raghu Rama Krishna Raju of YSR Congress Party.

Demographics 

As of the 2011 census of India, the town had a population of 81,199. The total population constitutes 40,103 males and 41,096 females—a sex ratio of 1024 females per 1000 males. 7,318 children are in the age group of 0–6 years, of whom 3,743 are boys and 3,575 are girls—a ratio of 955 girls per 1000 boys. The average literacy rate stands at 76.95%, significantly higher than the state average of 73.00%.

Language and religion 
Referred to as "Palakolian", the residents of Palakollu are predominantly Telugu, with a minority Gujarati (including Memon). Telugu is the official language. Hindus are in the majority. Muslims and Christians form a very small minority of the people in Palakollu.
According to the 2011 census, the religious makeup of Palakollu town was: Hindus (95.64%), Muslims (2.11%), Christians (1.97%), Jains (40 people), Sikhs (10 people) and Buddhists (3 people); 143 people did not state any religion.

Economy 
Agriculture-based businesses like food processing and rice mills are the chief sources of the town's revenue. It serves as a distribution centre as well as commercial centre to its hinterland. The town is the regional centre for higher education and is known for its specialized health services

Palakollu exports coconuts to all over India.

Industries
Handmade crochet lace-work is one of the most common form of industry in the town.

There are many industries and rice mills industries in and around the town.

Aquaculture

Fishery is one of the main occupations that generates good amounts of revenues for the fishermen. It involves cultivation of a variety of estuarine fish called Pulasa.

Cityscape

Neighbourhoods 

Palavelli Boutique Resorts is located at a distance of 12.9 km from the town. the resorts Nestled on the banks of the Vashista, a tributary of the River Godavari at Yalamnachalli Lanka, the Palavelli Boutique Resorts reflects the rich culture and tradition of the Konaseema region in Andhra Pradesh.

Landmarks 
The Perupalem Beach is located at a distance of 26 km from the town and Dindi Resorts is located at a distance of 15 km from the town. Palakollu has become a key landmark destination for foreigners due to monkey tourism.

Transport 

The town was once famed for its traffic problems with the railway gates at Bhimavaram Road (P.P Road) area. When the National Highway passed through the town, the traffic hurried to pass over the railway gate in the town and outskirts, which made traffic worse.

To avoid the traffic congestion, the government of India constructed a mini bypass road connecting Narsapur Road and Poolapalli on both ends of the town. Even then, the traffic problem were not resolved. The main bypass road (which was constructed under R&B which was completed in the late 2014s) had only 10,000 vehicles pass through the bypass road; now it has almost doubled.

Traffic in the town of narrow lanes was growing by the day. Even though officials planning to construct an underbridge at Bhimavaram Road (P.P Road) railway overbridge it is already approved from South Central railway at Palakollu town But still Pending in the project. and in the town all National Roads and R&B Roads still single lines only thay try to Since 1950 extend Roads making the one way but This is also Still Pending. 2018 year the traffic has doubled, without giving any relief to citizens. There are 25 traffic centres identified in the town.

Roadways 

Sri Potti Sriramulu bus station Located in palakollu town APSRTC operates buses from Palakollu to major cities like Hyderabad, Rajamahendravaram, Kakinada, Vizag, Vijayawada, and Tirupati. Ten express trains service the town, which is on the NarsapurVijayawada railway route. A bridge was built on Vasista Godavari near Chinchinada 8 km away from Palakollu connecting East Godavari and West Godavari Districts of Andhra Pradesh, which makes it a part of National Highway 216. Palakollu railway station is classified as a B–category station in South Central Railway zone.

Railways 

Palakollu Railway Station is classified as a B category station With three platforms In Vijayawada railway division. It is one of the main stations, and is located on the Bhimavaram–Narasapuram branch line, Nidadavole-Narsapuram railway line of South Central Railway zone.

Waterways 
National Waterway 4 was declared on 24 November 2008, and connects the Indian states of Telangana, Andhra Pradesh, Tamil Nadu, and the union territory of Puducherry. It passes through Kakinada, Rajahmundry, Eluru, Commanur, Buckingham Canal and also part of Krishna and Godavari rivers rivers. It is being developed by Inland Waterways Authority of India, and was scheduled for completion in 2013.

Airways 
Rajahmundry Airport is the airport serving to Palakollu 70 km away. A new terminal building was inaugurated on 16 May 2012. The runway is expanded from the 1,749 m to 3,165 m to facilitate the landing and takeoff of bigger aircraft. The state government is developing the airport as an international airport. Heli tourism is introduced in the airport.

Education
Palakollu plays a major role in education for urban and rural students from nearby villages. It has an average literacy rate of 83.90% with, according to the 2011 census, a total number of 63,097 who are literate. This includes 32,397 men (88.13%) and 30,700 women (79.82%).

Primary and secondary school education is provided by government, aided, and private schools, under the School Education Department of Andhra Pradesh. According to the school information report for the academic year 2016–17, the urban area has around 160 schools. These include government, residential, private, municipal, and other types of schools. There are more than 100 private schools and 49 municipal schools. There are more than 30,000 students in these schools.

Instruction is in Telugu, English and Urdu.

There are numerous higher educational institutions in and around Palakollu town. Some of the renowned institutions are Jogaiah Institute of Technology and Sciences, D.N.R Educational Institutions, Jogaiah Institute of agricultural engineering, A.S.N.M degree and P.G college, B.R.R & G.K.R Chambers Degree & PG College, Jogaiah institute of Technology and Sciences, College of Pharmacy.

See also 
 List of cities in Andhra Pradesh
 List of municipalities in Andhra Pradesh

References

External links 

 Palakollu City
 Palakollu Municipality Facebook page

 
Cities in Andhra Pradesh
Mandal headquarters in West Godavari district